Frisians in Peril (German: Friesennot) is a 1935 German drama film directed by Peter Hagen and starring Friedrich Kayßler, Jessie Vihrog and Valéry Inkijinoff. Made for Nazi propaganda purposes, it concerns a village of ethnic Frisians in Russia.

It was shot at the Grunewald Studios in Berlin. The film's sets were designed by the art directors Robert A. Dietrich and Bernhard Schwidewski. Location shooting took place around the Lüneburg Heath near Bispingen. It premiered at the Ufa-Palast am Zoo in the German capital.

Plot 
Soviet authorities are making life as difficult as possible for a village of Volga Germans, most of whose ancestors originated in the Frisian Islands, with taxes and other oppression.

After Mette, a half-Russian, half-Frisian woman, becomes the girlfriend of Kommissar Tschernoff, the Frisians murder her and throw her body in a swamp.

Open violence breaks out and all of the Red Army soldiers stationed nearby are killed by the villagers. They then set fire to their village and flee.

Cast 
Friedrich Kayßler as Jürgen Wagner
Helene Fehdmer as Kathrin Wagner
Valéry Inkijinoff as Kommissar Tschernoff
Jessie Vihrog as Das Mädchen Mette
Hermann Schomberg as Klaus Niegebüll
Ilse Fürstenberg as Dörte Niegebüll
Kai Möller as Hauke Peters
Fritz Hoopts as Ontje Ibs
Martha Ziegler as Wiebke Detlevsen
Gertrud Boll as Telse Detlevsen
Maria Koppenhöfer as Frau Winkler
Marianne Simson as Hilde Winkler
Franz Stein as Christian Kröger
Aribert Grimmer as Kommissar Krappien

Motifs
Despite Nazi hostility to religion, a cynical piece of anti-Communist propaganda depicts the Communists as posting obscene anti-religious posters, and the Frisians as piously declaring that all authority comes from God.

The portrayal of Kommissar Tschernoff does not conform to the heavy-handed depiction of Communists as brutal and murderous in such films as Flüchtlinge; he is truly and passionately in love with Mette, and only with her death does he unleash his soldiers.  A villager objects to the affair on the grounds that even though her mother was Russian, her father's Frisian blood "outweighs" foreign blood, and therefore she must not throw herself at a foreigner.  Her murder is presented as in accordance with the Nazi principle of "race defilement."

Ban and reversal
After the Molotov–Ribbentrop Pact, in 1939, the film was banned; in 1941, after the invasion of Russia, it was reissued under its new title.

References

External links 

1935 films
Films of Nazi Germany
1930s German-language films
German black-and-white films
1935 drama films
Nazi propaganda films
Films about the Soviet Union in the Stalin era
German drama films
1930s German films